Aedophron rhodites is a species of moth of the family Noctuidae. It is found in the eastern Mediterranean, including the Balkans, through Ukraine and Moldova to central Asia.

It is found on dry steppes and semi-deserts in Eurasia. It is more common in central Asian oases.

External links
 Images
 Fauna Europaea
 lepiforum.de
 lepidoptera.pl

Heliothinae
Moths of Europe
Moths of Asia
Moths described in 1851